This Is Us is the debut album of Greensboro, North Carolina rock band The Necessary. It was released on June 22, 2004 on Forsaken Recordings. In 2005, The Necessary signed with Drive-Thru Records and changed their name to House of Fools.

Track listing
All songs are written by The Necessary.
"Captivated" – 4:27
"This Is Us" – 3:56
"When It Hurts" – 3:55
"Honestly" – 3:01
"Channel 26" – 4:25
"So It Comes to This" – 4:00
"Apartment D" – 3:37
"Passion" – 4:03
"Rise and Shine" – 3:53
"Free Hands" – 2:31

Personnel
 Josh King – vocals, keyboards
 Joel Kiser – guitar
 Jeff Linn – bass
 David McLaughlin – guitar, vocals
 Todd Turner – drums

References

2004 debut albums